Martin Kuuskmann (born 21 April 1971) is an Estonian bassoon player.

Biography
Martin Kuuskmann was born in Tallinn, Estonia. He studied bassoon in Tallinn Music High School, Manhattan School of Music and Yale School of Music. His mentors include Stephen Maxym, Frank Morelli, Rufus Olivier, Vernon Read and Ilmar Aasmets.

Has taught at the Manhattan School of Music Contemporary Performance Program in New York City.  He is now the Professor of Bassoon at the University of Denver, Lamont School of Music. He is the director of the Fusion Program at the Blaine Jazz Festival for Teens in Washington state. Martin Kuuskmann makes his home in the Denver area with his wife and their three children.

Discography
 The Path of Mantra (with Peeter Vähi and Drikung Kagyu monks), 2002 Erdenklang, 21902
 Nonstop (with Kristjan Randalu), 2010 Estonian Record Productions, 2209 ERP
 Bassoon Concertos (with Tallinn Chamber Orchestra and Risto Joost), 2015 Estonian Record Productions, ERP 8215

References

External links
 
 AS Artists Management page about Kuuskmann
 Martin Kuuskmann on the website of ERP
 Interview with Tigran Arakelyan

Estonian classical bassoonists
Tallinn Music High School alumni
Manhattan School of Music alumni
Yale School of Music alumni
Musicians from Tallinn
1971 births
Living people
20th-century Estonian musicians
21st-century Estonian musicians